The 2013 Western and Southern Open was a men's and women's tennis tournament played on outdoor hard courts August 12–18, 2013. It was part of the ATP World Tour Masters 1000 of the 2013 ATP World Tour, and of the WTA Premier 5 tournaments of the 2013 WTA Tour. The 2013 tournament was the 112th edition (for the men) and the 85th (for the women) of the Cincinnati Masters. The tournament is held annually at the Lindner Family Tennis Center in Mason (a suburb of Cincinnati), Ohio, United States.

The tournament singles champions were: men's, Rafael Nadal; women's, Victoria Azarenka. This was also the last tournament for reigning Wimbledon champion Marion Bartoli.

Points and prize money

Point distribution

Prize money

ATP singles main-draw entrants

Seeds

 Rankings and seedings are as of August 5, 2013, before the draw is made

Other entrants
The following players received wild cards into the main singles draw:
  Brian Baker
  James Blake
  Ryan Harrison
  Jack Sock

The following players received entry from the singles qualifying draw:
  Pablo Andújar
  Benjamin Becker
  David Goffin
  Mackenzie McDonald
  Adrian Mannarino
  Édouard Roger-Vasselin
  Dmitry Tursunov

Withdrawals
Before the tournament
  Marin Čilić (suspension)
  Viktor Troicki (suspension)
  Jo-Wilfried Tsonga (left knee injury)

Retirements
  Gilles Simon (hip injury)
  Jérémy Chardy (left knee injury)

ATP doubles main-draw entrants

Seeds

 Rankings are as of August 5, 2013

Other entrants
The following pairs received wildcards into the doubles main draw:
  Brian Baker /  Rajeev Ram
  James Blake /  Steve Johnson

Withdrawals
During the tournament
  Jérémy Chardy (left knee injury)

WTA singles main-draw entrants

Seeds

Rankings are as of August 5, 2013

Other entrants
The following players received wild cards into the main singles draw:
  Lauren Davis
  Daniela Hantuchová
  Bethanie Mattek-Sands

The following players received entry from the singles qualifying draw:
  Petra Martić
  Eugenie Bouchard
  Vania King
  Annika Beck
  Sofia Arvidsson
  Andrea Petkovic
  Monica Puig
  Jana Čepelová
  Polona Hercog
  Anna Tatishvili
  Marina Erakovic
  Karin Knapp

The following player received entry as lucky loser:
  Monica Niculescu

Withdrawals
Before the tournament
  Sorana Cîrstea (abdominal injury)
  Kaia Kanepi
  Romina Oprandi
  Nadia Petrova
  Laura Robson (right wrist injury)
During the tournament
  Agnieszka Radwańska (personal reasons)

WTA doubles main-draw entrants

Seeds

 Rankings are as of August 5, 2013

Other entrants
The following pairs received wildcards into the doubles main draw:
  Kirsten Flipkens /  Petra Kvitová
  Daniela Hantuchová /  Martina Hingis
  Angelique Kerber /  Andrea Petkovic
  Vania King /  Alisa Kleybanova

Finals

Men's singles

 Rafael Nadal defeated  John Isner 7–6(10–8), 7–6(7–3)

Women's singles

 Victoria Azarenka defeated  Serena Williams, 2–6, 6–2, 7–6(8–6)

Men's doubles

 Bob Bryan /  Mike Bryan defeated  Marcel Granollers /  Marc López, 6–4, 4–6, [10–4]

Women's doubles

 Hsieh Su-wei /  Peng Shuai defeated  Anna-Lena Grönefeld /  Květa Peschke, 2–6, 6–3, [12–10]

References

External links
 
 Association of Tennis Professionals (ATP) tournament profile

 
2013 ATP World Tour
2013 WTA Tour
2013